Baron Jean-Louis Vincent is a Belgian physician and Professor of intensive care medicine at the Université libre de Bruxelles and intensivist in the Department of Intensive Care at Erasme University Hospital in Brussels.

Biography 
Jean-Louis Vincent studied at the Université Libre de Bruxelles where he obtained an MD in 1973. Jean-Louis Vincent trained in Internal Medicine and Critical Care at Hôpital d'Ixelles and Hôpital Universitaire St-Pierre in Brussels. He then spent two years training at the University of Southern California with Prof. Max Harry Weil. Jean-Louis Vincent earned his PhD in 1982 at the Université Libre de Bruxelles studying electro-mechanical dissociation during cardiac arrest. Vincent joined the Department of Intensive Care of Erasme University Hospital in Brussels (Université Libre de Bruxelles) in 1979, serving as Head of Department from 1996-2014 and currently as an intensivist consultant.

Jean-Louis Vincent has published more than 1.300 original scientific manuscripts, 1000 review articles and editorials, 400 bookchapters and has edited 123 books. His name appears more than 1300 times in PubMed, and his work has been cited more than 230,000 times with an H-index of 195. Jean-Louis Vincent is the editor-in-chief of Critical Care, Current Opinion in Critical Care, and ICU Management and Practice". Since 1980, he has organized an International Symposium on Intensive Care and Emergency Medicine which is held every March in Brussels. Jean-Louis Vincent is past-President of the World Federation of Societies of Intensive and Critical Care Medicine, the European Society of Intensive Care Medicine, the European Shock Society, the Belgian Society of Intensive Care Medicine and the International Sepsis Forum. He was a Council member of the Society of Critical Care Medicine from 2011-2013. He is a member of the Belgian Royal Academy of Medicine.
Since 1980, he is organizing every year in Brussels the International Symposium on Intensive Care and Emergency Medicine (ISICEM).

Jean-Louis Vincent has received several awards for his work with the critically ill: the Distinguished Investigator Award of the Society of Critical Care Medicine, the College Medalist Award of the American College of Chest Physicians, the "Society Medal” (lifetime award) of the European Society of Intensive Care Medicine, and the prestigious Belgian scientific award of the FRS-FNRS (Prix Scientifique Joseph Maisin-Sciences biomédicales cliniques).

Editorial boards

Editor 
Update in Intensive Care and Emergency Medicine
Yearbook of Intensive Care and Emergency Medicine
Annual Update in Intensive Care and Emergency Medicine
Sepsis Grave et Choc Septique...
Insuffisance Circulatoire Aiguë
Controversies in Acute Kidney Injury
Textbook of Critical Care
Encyclopedia of Intensive Care Medicine
Terapia Intensiva

Selected bibliography

References

External links 
Jean-Louis Vincent publications indexed by Google Scholar

Belgian intensivists